Cassandra "Cassie" Palmer is a fictional character in the Cassandra Palmer series of novels written by novelist Karen Chance. Her first appearance is in Touch the Dark, the first book in the series.

Cassie is introduced as a clairvoyant who has been on the run for three years from Antonio, a Mafioso vampire who raised her after her parents' death. Antonio used Cassie's powers for his purposes, and kept Cassie isolated.

Fictional characters with precognition
Characters in fantasy novel series